Boron deficiency is a pathology which may occur in animals due to a lack of boron. A report given by E. Wayne Johnson et al. at the 2005 Alan D. Leman Swine Conference suggests that boron deficiency produces osteochondrosis in swine that is correctable by addition of 50 ppm of boron to the diet. The tolerable daily intake (TDI) set by the World Health Organization (WHO) is 0.17 mg/kg of body weight for humans.

See also
 Ultratrace element

References

Boron
Nutritional deficiencies